Kandathil Mammen Philip is an Indian entrepreneur from the South Indian state Kerala and a director of MRF Limited and Malayala Manorama group with business interests in tea, coffee and cardamom plantations and processing. He is also a director of many other companies such as Rembrandt and Vandykes Limited, Commercial Broadcasts Limited, India Coffee and Tea distributing Company Limited and Balanoor Plantations and Industries limited. Born to K. C. Mammen Mappillai and Kunjandamma (Modisseril family) as the sixth of their nine children, Philip is considered by many as the father of Indian rubber industry. Philip was honored by the Government of India, in 2001, with the fourth highest Indian civilian award of Padma Shri. His eldest brother, Kandathil Mammen Cherian and one of his younger brothers, Kandathil Mammen Mathew are recipients of Padma Bhushan awards while another younger brother, K. M. Mammen Mappillai and one of his nephews, K. M. Mammen Mathew have won Padma Shri awards.

See also

 MRF Limited
 Malayala Manorama

References

Living people
Recipients of the Padma Shri in trade and industry
Businesspeople from Kottayam
Indian chief executives
Malayali people
Year of birth missing (living people)